Brea Pozo is a municipality and small town in Santiago del Estero Province in Argentina.

References

Populated places in Santiago del Estero Province